Antoni Ballero de Càndia (born 1927 in Alghero, Sardinia, died 9 March 2009) was an Italian poet and lawyer, member of La Palmavera society. Almost all of his works are in Algherese dialect, a variety of the Catalan language spoken in Sardinia.

Works
 Música de serenades (1951)
 Vida (1951)
 Alghero, Cara de roses (1961)

References

1927 births
Italian male writers
20th-century Italian lawyers
2009 deaths